Algonquian language may refer to:

 Algonquian languages, language sub-family indigenous to North America
 Algonquin language, an Algonquian language closely related to the Ojibwe language